Courlander may refer to:

Demonym
 Someone from Courland
 Something related to the historic Duchy of Courland and Semigallia

People
 Harold Courlander (1908—1996), an American anthropologist
 Roy Courlander (1914–1979), a New Zealand soldier who served in the British Free Corps, a unit of the German Waffen-SS